All Distortions Are Intentional is the fourth studio album by Welsh rock band Neck Deep, released on 24 July 2020 by Hopeless Records. It was produced by Matt Squire and mixed by Seb Barlow. It is the first album to not feature Fil Thorpe-Evans, who left in the Fall of 2018, and is the last to feature original member and drummer Dani Washington before his departure in 2022. The band's photographer Joshua Halling recorded bass on all tracks on this album. He ultimately decided not to join the band full-time and was later replaced by Seb Barlow, longtime collaborator of the band and brother of frontman Ben Barlow.

Billed as a concept album, its story takes place in Sonderland—an exaggerated portrayal of society inhabited by lead characters Jett and Alice, who together deal with issues of love, loss, disillusionment and despair. The album also marks a significant departure from the bands more pop-punk leaning sound featured on their previous albums in favor of a more alternative rock and pop rock inspired sound.

Five singles were released to promote the album accompanied with music videos: "Lowlife", "When You Know", "Fall", "I Revolve (Around You)" and "Sick Joke".

Background

The group spent most of the second half of 2017 and 2018 touring in support of their third album The Peace and the Panic including performances at Slam Dunk Festival in the UK and the Warped Tour in the US. Soon after, bassist Fil Thorpe-Evans departed from the band to pursue a solo career and was replaced by Joshua Halling, the band's photographer. With their new member, the band released a single in June 2019 and embarked on a summer tour with Blink-182 and Lil Wayne. Following this they took the rest of the year off from touring. On 11 February 2020 they launched their official app. They also announced that longtime behind-the-scenes contributor and touring musician Seb Barlow had replaced Joshua Halling after completion of their new album.

The premise for the album first arose when Barlow got the idea for "Lowlife" during the Blink-182 tour. He played the rough draft of the song so frequently on the bus that other members got sick of it. The nonsensical and whimsical lyrics of the song inspired the creation of characters Jett and Alice, and their storyline began to take shape.

"Sonderland" is a portmanteau of the words "sonder"—"the profound feeling of realizing that everyone, including strangers passed in the street, has a life as complex as one's own, which they are constantly living despite one's personal lack of awareness of it"—and "wonderland".

Critical reception

All Distortions Are Intentional has received generally positive reviews from music critics. Exclaim! Eva Zhu considers that it "might be the band's best work".

Track listing

Personnel
Neck Deep
 Ben Barlow – lead vocals
 Sam Bowden – lead guitar, backing vocals
 Dani Washington – drums
 Matt West – rhythm guitar

Production
 Matt Squire – producer
 Seb Barlow – mix engineer
 Joshua Halling – bass guitar, backing vocals 
Design
 Tom Noon – album artwork

Charts

References

2020 albums
Neck Deep albums
Hopeless Records albums